The Daily FT or the Daily Financial Times is a daily English-language newspaper published in Colombo, Sri Lanka, by Wijeya Newspapers.

Its sister newspaper The Daily Mirror (Sri Lanka) and its Sunday counterpart Sunday Times are among the important newspapers in Sri Lanka.

See also
Lankadeepa, Sinhala-language sister newspaper
Tamil Mirror, Tamil-language sister newspaper

Notes

External links
 Daily FT – Official Website
 Daily Mirror – Official Website
 Sunday Times – Official Website

Daily newspapers published in Sri Lanka
English-language newspapers published in Sri Lanka
Newspapers established in 2010
Wijeya Newspapers
Mass media in Colombo